Divo Department is a department of Lôh-Djiboua Region in Gôh-Djiboua District, Ivory Coast. In 2021, its population was 571,688 and its seat is the settlement of Divo. The sub-prefectures of the department are Chiépo, Didoko, Divo, Hiré, Nébo, Ogoudou, and Zégo.

History
Divo Department was created in 1969 as one of the 24 new departments that were created to take the place of the six departments that were being abolished. It was created from territory that was formerly part of Sud Department. Using current boundaries as a reference, from 1969 to 1980 the department occupied the territory of Lôh-Djiboua Region plus Fresco Department.

In 1980, Divo Department was divided to create Lakota Department. In 1997, regions were introduced as new first-level subdivisions of Ivory Coast; as a result, all departments were converted into second-level subdivisions. Divo Department was included in Sud-Bandama Region.

Divo Department was divided a second time in 2008 to create Fresco Department and a third time in 2009 to create Guitry Department.

In 2011, districts were introduced as new first-level subdivisions of Ivory Coast. At the same time, regions were reorganised and became second-level subdivisions and all departments were converted into third-level subdivisions. At this time, Divo Department became part of Lôh-Djiboua Region in Gôh-Djiboua District.

Maps of historical boundaries

Notes

Departments of Lôh-Djiboua
1969 establishments in Ivory Coast
States and territories established in 1969